Yosemite Lakes Park (Yosemite, Miwok for "killer") is an unincorporated community in Madera County, California. As a census-designated place (CDP) it is known as Yosemite Lakes. It is part of the Madera Metropolitan Statistical Area. The population was 5,022 at the 2020 census.

Geography
Its northwest border follows the Fresno River, and to the south and east it is bound by Coarsegold creek.

Demographics

2010
The 2010 United States Census reported that Yosemite Lakes had a population of 4,952. The racial makeup of Yosemite Lakes was 4,408 (89.0%) White, 38 (0.8%) African American, 91 (1.8%) Native American, 51 (1.0%) Asian, 8 (0.2%) Pacific Islander, 131 (2.6%) from other races, and 225 (4.5%) from two or more races. Hispanic or Latino of any race were 517 persons (10.4%).

The Census reported that 4,952 people (100% of the population) lived in households, 0 (0%) lived in non-institutionalized group quarters, and 0 (0%) were institutionalized.

There were 1,902 households, out of which 569 (29.9%) had children under the age of 18 living in them, 1,304 (68.6%) were opposite-sex married couples living together, 136 (7.2%) had a female householder with no husband present, 83 (4.4%) had a male householder with no wife present.  There were 69 (3.6%) unmarried opposite-sex partnerships, and 10 (0.5%) same-sex married couples or partnerships. 295 households (15.5%) were made up of individuals, and 135 (7.1%) had someone living alone who was 65 years of age or older. The average household size was 2.60.  There were 1,523 families (80.1% of all households); the average family size was 2.87.

The population was spread out, with 1,114 people (22.5%) under the age of 18, 252 people (5.1%) aged 18 to 24, 964 people (19.5%) aged 25 to 44, 1,666 people (33.6%) aged 45 to 64, and 956 people (19.3%) who were 65 years of age or older.  The median age was 47.2 years. For every 100 females, there were 98.9 males.  For every 100 females age 18 and over, there were 99.7 males.

The homeowner vacancy rate was 3.6%; the rental vacancy rate was 9.3%.  4,061 people (82.0% of the population) lived in owner-occupied housing units and 891 people (18.0%) lived in rental housing units.

2000
As of the census of 2000, there were 4,160 people, 1,534 households, and 1,288 families residing in the CDP. The racial makeup of the CDP was 93.20% White, 0.36% African American, 0.99% Native American, 0.70% Asian, 0.41% Pacific Islander, 2.28% from other races, and 2.07% from two or more races. Hispanic or Latino of any race were 7.93% of the population.

There were 1,534 households, out of which 32.1% had children under the age of 18 living with them, 73.6% were married couples living together, 7.4% had a female householder with no husband present, and 16.0% were non-families. 12.6% of all households were made up of individuals, and 4.7% had someone living alone who was 65 years of age or older.  The average household size was 2.71 and the average family size was 2.95.

In the CDP, the population was spread out, with 25.1% under the age of 18, 4.8% from 18 to 24, 23.4% from 25 to 44, 29.4% from 45 to 64, and 17.2% who were 65 years of age or older.  The median age was 43 years. For every 100 females, there were 97.7 males.  For every 100 females age 18 and over, there were 94.5 males.

The median income for a household in the CDP was $56,382, and the median income for a family was $58,341. Males had a median income of $44,792 versus $31,442 for females. The per capita income for the CDP was $24,096.  About 3.5% of families and 3.5% of the population were below the poverty line, including 1.6% of those under age 18 and 4.2% of those age 65 or over.

Government

References

Unincorporated communities in Madera County, California
Census-designated places in Madera County, California
Unincorporated communities in California